The Dornier Do 29 was a proposed zerstörer, or heavy fighter, designed by Dornier as a competitor to the Messerschmitt Bf 110.

The design answered the Reich Air Ministry requirement in autumn 1934 for a heavy fighter. Highly derivative of the earlier Do 17, the design was rejected before the prototype stage, and work stopped in 1936.

Specifications (estimated)

See also

References

 

Abandoned military aircraft projects of Germany
Do 029
1930s German fighter aircraft

de:Dornier Do 29